Star Trek: Lower Decks is an American adult animated television series created by Mike McMahan for the streaming service CBS All Access (later rebranded as Paramount+). It is the ninth Star Trek series and debuted in 2020 as part of executive producer Alex Kurtzman's expanded Star Trek Universe. Lower Decks is the franchise's first animated series since the 1970s series Star Trek: The Animated Series, and its first comedic series. It follows the low-ranking support crew of the starship Cerritos beginning in the year 2380.

Tawny Newsome, Jack Quaid, Noël Wells, and Eugene Cordero voice junior "lower decks" crew members of the Cerritos, with Dawnn Lewis, Jerry O'Connell, Fred Tatasciore, and Gillian Vigman providing voices for the ship's senior officers. Work on an animated Star Trek series began in June 2018. McMahan joined as creator and showrunner by that October, when Lower Decks was ordered for two seasons by All Access. The series is produced by CBS Eye Animation Productions in association with Secret Hideout, Important Science, Roddenberry Entertainment, and animation studio Titmouse who began work by February 2019. The main cast was announced that July. Production on the first two seasons shifted to taking place remotely in March 2020 due to the COVID-19 pandemic. The series features many connections and references to past Star Trek series.

Star Trek: Lower Decks premiered on CBS All Access on August 6, 2020, and its 10-episode first season ran until October 2020. A second season was released on Paramount+ from August to October 2021, and a third season premiered in August 2022. A fourth season is expected to be released in 2023. The series has received mixed reviews from critics, as well as several accolades including a Primetime Emmy Award nomination.

Premise
Star Trek: Lower Decks is set in the late 24th century in the Star Trek universe, in which Earth is part of the multi-species United Federation of Planets. The Federation's military and exploration division, Starfleet, operates a fleet of starships that travel the galaxy establishing contact with alien races; Lower Decks focuses on one of Starfleet's least important starships, the USS Cerritos. Unlike previous Star Trek series, whose principal characters are typically starship captains or other senior officers, Lower Decks focuses on the missions and adventures of the "lower deckers", low-ranking officers with menial jobs, while the captain and other senior staff appear as supporting characters.

Episodes

Season 1 (2020)

Season 2 (2021)

Season 3 (2022)

Season 4

A 10-episode fourth season was ordered in January 2022, and writing began by that April. Voice recording for the season began by June.

Cast and characters

 Tawny Newsome as Beckett Mariner:A human ensign aboard the USS Cerritos and the daughter of Captain Freeman. Newsome described Mariner as an irreverent rule-breaker who has been demoted several times, though she is actually "very good at all things Starfleet". The character is named after showrunner Mike McMahan's sister, Beckett Mariner McMahan.
 Jack Quaid as Brad Boimler:A human ensign aboard the Cerritos, Boimler is a stickler for the rules and will need to learn how to improvise if he is to become a captain one day. Quaid said the character would "nail the written portion of the driving test with flying colors but once it actually got to him being in the car, it would be a complete and total disaster."
 Noël Wells as D'Vana Tendi:An Orion ensign in the medical bay aboard the Cerritos, Tendi is a big fan of Starfleet, and is thrilled to be on a starship. She is new to the Cerritos at the start of the series, and helps introduce the audience to the setting and characters. McMahan said he would act like Tendi if he ever got to work on a starship.
 Eugene Cordero as Sam Rutherford:A human ensign aboard the Cerritos, Rutherford is adjusting to a new cyborg implant. McMahan compared Rutherford to the Star Trek: The Next Generation character Geordi La Forge, saying they are both "amazing at engineering stuff" but Rutherford does not always solve the problem like Geordi because he is still learning.
 Dawnn Lewis as Carol Freeman:The human captain of the Cerritos. McMahan described her as a capable Starfleet captain whose starship is not very important. Freeman does not want her daughter, Mariner, to be on the Cerritos and is looking for a reason to have her transferred to another ship.
 Jerry O'Connell as Jack Ransom:The human first officer of the Cerritos whom McMahan compared to Next Generations William Riker, if he was on speed and had less shame.
 Fred Tatasciore as Shaxs:A Bajoran tactical officer aboard the Cerritos.  At the end of the first season, Shaxs dies sacrificing himself for Rutherford but returns in the second season in a storyline that plays on the numerous times and ways that characters have been resurrected in previous Star Trek series.
 Gillian Vigman as T'Ana:A Caitian doctor and head of medical aboard the Cerritos. McMahan described her as a "good doctor, but she's an unpleasant cat". Including a Caitian in the series is a reference to Star Trek: The Animated Series which also features a member of that species, M'Ress.

Production

Development
In June 2018, after becoming sole showrunner of the series Star Trek: Discovery, Alex Kurtzman signed a five-year overall deal with CBS Television Studios to expand the Star Trek franchise beyond Discovery to several new series, miniseries, and animated series. Aaron Baiers of Kurtzman's production company Secret Hideout brought Mike McMahan—the head writer of popular animated comedy Rick and Morty—to a general meeting about animation in Star Trek. Baiers and McMahan had been television assistants together when McMahan was running the Twitter fan account @TNG_S8, suggesting stories for a theoretical eighth season of Star Trek: The Next Generation. McMahan was asked what his dream Star Trek series would be, and pitched a series following "the people who put the yellow cartridge in the food replicator so a banana can come out the other end".

After winning over executives with his initial pitch, Secret Hideout moved forward with McMahan's series. It was marketed to different platforms and networks before being picked up by CBS All Access, the streaming service that was releasing Discovery, who officially ordered two seasons on October 25, 2018. Titled Star Trek: Lower Decks, it was the service's first original animated series and the first animated Star Trek series since the 1973–74 series Star Trek: The Animated Series. McMahan was set to create, write, and executive produce Lower Decks alongside Kurtzman, Secret Hideout's Heather Kadin, Rod Roddenberry (the son of Star Trek creator Gene Roddenberry) and Trevor Roth of Roddenberry Entertainment, and veteran animation executive-turned-producer Katie Krentz of the newly formed CBS Eye Animation Productions. In January 2019, Kurtzman said the series would not be "Rick and Morty in the world of Star Trek" and would have its own tone, but would "skew slightly more adult". That July, McMahan announced that the first season would consist of 10 episodes and be released in 2020.

By late March 2020, work on the series was taking place remotely due to the COVID-19 pandemic forcing staff to work from home. In May, McMahan said animation was "uniquely suited for this moment" since the series' animators could continue work on the series from home. In July, All Access scheduled the series to premiere in August 2020. A third season was ordered in April 2021 for the rebranded Paramount+, ahead of the second-season premiere in August 2021. The third season was confirmed for a late-2022 release when a fourth season was ordered in January 2022, which is expected to be released in 2023.

Writing
The series is set in 2380, one year after the film Star Trek: Nemesis (2002), and, unlike typical Star Trek series, focuses on the support crew of a starship rather than the main bridge crew. McMahan set the series shortly after Nemesis, the last Star Trek film in the Next Generation era, due to his love of The Next Generation. The series is named after the Next Generation episode "Lower Decks", which also focuses on the lives of lower-ranking starship personnel and which McMahan said was his favorite episode of any Star Trek series; the episode was the first thing McMahan showed the Lower Decks writers room when they started work on the series. McMahan was inspired by the social side-stories in episodes of The Next Generation, with Kurtzman explaining that the "A story" of a typical Star Trek episode would be taking place in the background of each Lower Decks episode, so "huge, crazy, crazy shit is going on in the background and that's super peripheral to the story that you're actually focusing on". Kurtzman felt this made the series a unique addition to the franchise. Starting in late 2019, astrophysicist Erin Macdonald joined the Star Trek franchise as a science advisor. Macdonald said each series was on a "spectrum of science to fiction" and the Lower Decks writers approached science from the perspective of "we can get away with a lot more" than the live-action series, so her role was mostly to fix small dialogue mistakes to ensure the correct terms were being used.

The main setting of the series is the starship USS Cerritos, a "California-class" ship. This ship class, created for Lower Decks, is a class of support starships that work with larger starships like those seen previously in the franchise, but are not "important enough" to have appeared on screen before. McMahan described the mission of the Cerritos as "Second Contact": after Starfleet has made first contact with a new alien civilization and invited it to join the Federation, the crew of support ships like the Cerritos arrive to find "all the good places to eat [and set up] the communications stuff". McMahan wanted California-class ships to be named after Californian cities, and chose the city of Cerritos because he otherwise only knew it for local Cerritos Auto Square car dealership advertisements. He wanted to give the city "one more thing other than just being the home of the Auto Square".

McMahan did not want the humor to be "punching down on Trek" and focused on telling Star Trek stories where the characters happen to be funny. Writers from different comedic backgrounds and with different levels of Star Trek interest were hired. Kurtzman described Lower Decks as a love letter to Star Trek, and it is filled with many references to other Star Trek series. McMahan said these were there to "create a rich, vibrant, fun expression of the world of Star Trek in that era" rather than just be Easter eggs for fans to pick through. It was important to the team that these not distract from the emotional storytelling and also fit within established canon, with Star Trek author David Mack consulting on the series to ensure that it fit into the franchise. McMahan hoped that references to The Animated Series specifically would honor it as the franchise's first animated series. The characters often use the real-world titles of past Star Trek episodes when referencing those events, with McMahan explaining that the personal logs of famous characters are given similar in-universe titles to the episodes they are from. The franchise established that "Star Trek characters watch Star Trek" in the series finale of Star Trek: Enterprise, where the events of an earlier mission are recreated with a hologram, and McMahan felt many events from past series would be common knowledge within Starfleet. Acknowledging this allowed the main characters to be "geeks for Star Trek", which let Lower Decks be a "Rosetta Stone" connecting all previous Star Trek projects.

Casting and voice recording
Kurtzman stated in June 2019 that the series would mostly focus on new characters, but there was potential for characters from previous Star Trek series to appear at some point. The next month, McMahan announced the main cast and characters for the series, including ensigns serving in the "lower decks" of the Cerritos—Tawny Newsome as Beckett Mariner, Jack Quaid as Brad Boimler, Noël Wells as D'Vana Tendi, and Eugene Cordero as Sam Rutherford—and the ship's bridge crew who believe "the show is about them, but it's not"—Dawnn Lewis as Captain Carol Freeman, Jerry O'Connell as first officer Commander Jack Ransom, Fred Tatasciore as security chief Lieutenant Shaxs, and Gillian Vigman as chief medical officer Dr. T'Ana. Voice overs for each episode are recorded before any animation work is done, with the different recordings edited together into what McMahan described as an "old-timey radio play version of the episode". Initially, actors were recorded together such as Newsome and Quaid, but this stopped during production on the first season due to the COVID-19 pandemic. This became one of the biggest challenges for the series during the pandemic, with a need to use remote recording equipment in each actor's house. Newsome used a recording studio that she already had at her house.

Animation and design
Independent animation studio Titmouse provides the animation for the series. Their process involves the "board teams" drawing a rough version of the episode in black-and-white based on the initial "radio play" version of the voice actor recordings. These are put together as an animatic which the animators use as a basis for the final animation with full details and colors. Juno Lee served as supervising director for the first season, with first-season episodic director Barry J. Kelly taking over as supervising director with the second season. Titmouse CCO Antonio Canobbio guided the overall animation style for the series.

McMahan wanted the series' animation style to reflect the look of "prime time animated comedy" series that he grew up with, such as The Simpsons and Futurama, as well as previous comedy series that he had worked on such as Rick and Morty. This included a "prime time look" for the characters based on the "every-man vibe of The Simpsons" which meant that even the alien characters felt human and grounded. However, he did want the backgrounds and environments to be more detailed than is traditional for prime time animation, reflecting the designs of the Next Generation era of Star Trek for the series' sets, starships, cinematography, and character movements. The team tried to follow the same rules that would apply to a live-action Star Trek series that was set in 2380, and used the wiki encyclopedia Memory Alpha as well as other fan resources to ensure they were staying accurate to the original designs of the era. The animators also watched episodes of The Next Generation while they were working on the series, which uses the same blue font as The Next Generation for its credits. The opening title sequence features the Cerritos flying through Next Generation-like situations with a sweeping musical score, but with twists such as it being sucked into a vortex or immediately turning around after arriving at a battle. The uniforms worn by the crew of the Cerritos are based on unused designs for the film Star Trek Generations (1994).

Kelly said the Cerritos was designed to stand-up as a model alongside the live-action starships already seen in the franchise, with some adjustments then made to fit the animation style of the series. It is a Next Generation version of the USS Reliant from the film Star Trek II: The Wrath of Khan (1982), McMahan's favorite Star Trek starship. The California-class starships seen in the series feature the same colors as the uniforms, with yellow for engineering, blue for medical, and red for command (the Cerritos is yellow). For interiors of the Cerritos such as the carpet, walls, and ceiling, elements of the LCARS computer system from The Next Generation were included in the design, with "those swooping shapes [being] part of the overall architecture of the ship". The particles of transporter beams were also drawn to be "little pill-shaped tubes" in the LCARS style, while actual LCARS displays are featured throughout the ship as well. Michael Okuda, who designed the LCARS system for The Next Generation, consulted with the animation team on the series' LCARS designs and colors.

Music
In January 2020, frequent Star Trek composer Jeff Russo said it may not be possible for him to compose the score for Lower Decks due to his workload and the large number of Star Trek series being produced at the same time. He suggested that he could oversee some other composers for Lower Decks and the other Star Trek series if Kurtzman asked him to. In July, Chris Westlake was revealed to be the composer after working with McMahan on Solar Opposites. McMahan said Westlake's score sounded like a traditional Star Trek score that fit within the fast-paced, comedic style of Lower Decks. Westlake felt it would be funnier if sincere music scored the comedic series, which is why the main theme includes a choir. He wrote six or seven different main theme ideas that were narrowed down to two, with one being energetic and the other having a slower, more stately feel. The final theme is "between" these two. A soundtrack album featuring music from the first two seasons was released by Lakeshore Records on October 8, 2021. All music composed by Chris Westlake:

Sound
Once the animation is completed, the last element of the series is the final sound design. McMahan noted that the same level of care was applied to the series' sound design as its animation in terms of honoring "legacy" elements from previous Star Trek series. Sounds from earlier in the franchise that were studied and replicated include those for existing technology, such as the noises made by different phasers, the different sounds made when making or receiving a call using a Starfleet badge, or the sound of the ships' warp core. They also include the general "room tone" of different areas of the ship, such as the bridge, different hallways, and crew quarters. General sound design was also required, such as for the sound of characters' footsteps. Once the sound design is completed, these sounds are mixed with the voice recordings and score in a final mix for the episodes.

Release

Star Trek: Lower Decks premiered on August 6, 2020, on CBS All Access in the United States. Each episode is broadcast in Canada by Bell Media on the same day as the U.S. release, on the specialty channels CTV Sci-Fi Channel (English) and Z (French) before streaming on Crave. In September 2020, ViacomCBS announced that CBS All Access would be expanded and rebranded as Paramount+ in March 2021. After CBS All Access was rebranded Paramount+, the first season remained on the service and future seasons were confirmed to be released on it.

International distribution was not secured by the series' premiere after negotiations were impacted by the COVID-19 pandemic. In December 2020, Amazon Prime Video was revealed to have the streaming rights in several territories—including Europe, Australia, New Zealand, Japan, and India—with the first season released on the service on January 22, 2021. The series is distributed worldwide by Paramount Global Distribution Group. In February 2023, Paramount made a new deal with Prime Video for the series' international streaming rights. This allowed all existing seasons to be added to Paramount+ in some other countries in addition to remaining on Prime Video.

Reception

Critical response
{{Television critical response
| series            = Star Trek: Lower Decks

| link1             = Star Trek: Lower Decks (season 1)#Critical response
| rotten_tomatoes1  = 68% (47 reviews)
| metacritic1       = 59 (17 reviews)

| link2             = Star Trek: Lower Decks (season 2)#Critical response
| rotten_tomatoes2  = 100% (12 reviews)
| metacritic2       = 

| link3             = Star Trek: Lower Decks (season 3)#Critical response
| rotten_tomatoes3  = 100% (5 reviews)
| metacritic3       = 

}}

Star Trek: Lower Decks has an 84% approval rating on the review aggregator website Rotten Tomatoes, while Metacritic, which uses a weighted average, has assigned a score of 59 out of 100 based on reviews from 18 critics, indicating "mixed or average reviews".

For the first season, Rotten Tomatoes reported a 68% approval score with an average rating of 7.20/10 based on 47 reviews. The website's critical consensus reads, "Fun, but not very bold, Lower Decks flips the script on Star Trek regulation just enough to stand out in the franchise, if not the greater animation landscape." Metacritic assigned a score of 59 out of 100 based on reviews from 17 critics, indicating "mixed or average reviews". Rotten Tomatoes reported a 100% approval score for the second season with an average rating of 8.30/10 based on 12 reviews, and a 100% approval score for the third season with an average rating of 8.00/10 based on 5 reviews.

Accolades

Tie-in media

Aftershow

A special episode of the official Star Trek aftershow The Ready Room, hosted by Star Trek: The Next Generation actor Wil Wheaton, was released following the premiere of Lower Decks. Wheaton returned for further aftershow episodes, which were released following key episodes of the series.

Comic book
The first comic book tie-in for the series, a three-issue miniseries written by Ryan North with art by Chris Fenoglio, was released by IDW Publishing in September 2022.

Crossover

At San Diego Comic-Con in July 2022, Kurtzman announced that an episode of Star Trek: Strange New Worlds second season would be a crossover with Lower Decks, featuring a mixture of live-action and animation. Newsome and Quaid reprise their roles from Lower Decks in the crossover.

Video games
A free-to-play mobile game based on the series was revealed in February 2022, announced as Star Trek: Lower Decks TBD (or Star Trek: Lower Decks The Badgey Directive). Developed by East Side Games and Mighty Kingdom for iOS and Android, it was set to feature the series' rogue artificial intelligence Badgey. It was released later in 2022 with the title Star Trek Lower Decks Mobile. In April, the mobile strategy game Star Trek Fleet Command launched a Lower Decks-themed expansion, adding the Cerritos, Mariner, Boimler, Badgey, and a new function called "Below Decks Abilities" that allows players to select a support crew with "additional abilities that can combine to provide... benefits to player ships".

References

External links
 
 Star Trek: Lower Decks on Paramount+
 
 

2020 American television series debuts
2020s American adult animated television series
2020s American comic science fiction television series
American adult animated adventure television series
American adult animated comedy television series
American adult animated science fiction television series
Animated space adventure television series
Animated television series about extraterrestrial life
English-language television shows
Interquel television series
Paramount+ original programming
Lower Decks
Television series by CBS Studios
Television series by CBS Eye Animation Productions
Television series by Roddenberry Entertainment
Television series set in the 24th century
Television shows based on works by Gene Roddenberry